Đông Du (journey to the east) was a Vietnamese political movement founded by Phan Bội Châu at the start of the 20th century that encouraged young Vietnamese to go east to Japan to study, in the hope of training a new era of revolutionaries to rise against French colonial rule. Other notable proponents of Dong Du include Phan Chu Trinh and Prince Cường Để. In 1906 there were only 20 students in Japan, but October 1907, there were over 100 students in Japan, more than half from the South.

References

20th century in Vietnam
Vietnamese independence movement
Phan Bội Châu
Vietnamese expatriates in Japan